Leonard Joel Baker (January 17, 1945 – April 12, 1982) was an American actor of stage, film, and television, best known for his Golden-Globe-nominated performance in the 1976 Paul Mazursky film Next Stop, Greenwich Village and his 1977 Tony Award-winning performance in the stage play I Love My Wife.

Early life and education
Baker was born in Brookline, Massachusetts, the middle child of William, who owned his own plumbing business, and Bertha (née August) Baker. He had two brothers, Alan and Malcolm, and described his upbringing as "middle-middle class."

As the middle child, he referred to himself as "the pickle in the middle" and dreamed of being in musicals. He began acting in kindergarten, where he was cast as an elephant in a school play, and from fourth grade on, he was "constantly" on stage, eventually becoming the vice president of Brookline High School's dramatic society.

While his brothers followed his father into plumbing, Baker stuck to acting. After graduating from high school, in 1962, he went to Boston University, where he majored in acting. He graduated in 1966. Throughout college, he appeared in the Spa Music Theatre in Saratoga Springs, New York, with Boston University's Theatre Division, and with the Harvard Summer Players at the Loeb Drama Center.

Career

Theatre
Baker described himself as a "skinny, silly shlump." He played offbeat characters, which he described as being "long, skinny funny-looking goofy types."

Coming out of college, Baker claimed to have offers to do theatre in New York, which he turned down out of fear of being reduced to "a spear carrier." Instead, he accepted an offer from Richard Block, the director of the Actors Theatre of Louisville (ATL) in Kentucky, to be a journeyman, rounding out its 10 principal cast members:

In September 1966, he made his acting debut, playing Tom Stark in All the King's Men, at ATL. The following year, he made Actors' Equity and earned the minimum, $125 per week (approximately $950 in 2019). He remained at ATL through May 1968.

He then went to the Center Stage in Baltimore until he made his Off Broadway debut in 1969 in City Scene. He followed with three plays by Israel Horovitz at the Manhattan Theatre Club, a performance in The Year Boston Won the Pennant at Lincoln Center, as well as roles in Summertree and The Real Inspector Hound.

In 1974, Baker went to Paris, where he performed two Israel Horovitz one-act plays: Hop Scotch and Spared. The same year, he made his Broadway debut in The Freedom of the Theatre. In 1976, he performed with the Phoenix Company in Secret Service, Boy Meets Girl, Pericles, Prince of Tyre, and The Merry Wives of Windsor. He later did a season with the New York Shakespeare Festival, during which he appeared in Henry V and Measure for Measure. However, his biggest performance was in I Love My Wife.

Beyond Broadway, Baker performed in other regional theater productions in Chicago, St. Louis, and his native Boston. He spent five summers at the O'Neill Center's National Playwrights Conference and its Theatre for the Deaf in Waterford, Connecticut, working with young playwrights. He called his time at the O'Neill Theatre his "best training," stating that watching the deaf taught him to be "so brazen with the comic use of his body."

In August 1977, Baker's Broadway contract was due to be re-negotiated. He was hesitant to commit to more than one year, stating:

Film and television
Baker appeared in a number of television shows, such as Kojak, Starsky and Hutch, The Rockford Files, and Taxi. In 1973, he appeared in the acclaimed TV film Pueblo.

His most prominent film roles include The Paper Chase and the lead in Next Stop, Greenwich Village, Paul Mazursky's 1976 semi-autobiographical film.

Personal life
At the height of his career, Baker was 6'0" and 145 pounds. He was knob-kneed and was described as a "long, lean and lanky, stringbean of a chap with the most formidable nose in entertainment since Jimmy Durante." It was often due to his physique and nose that he got auditions, jobs and laughs. However, as a child, Baker had been self-conscious about his body, particularly his prominent nose:

On opening night of I Love My Wife, his apartment was burglarized. Along with his television set, his bar-mitzvah ring was stolen.

Baker was a feminist. In 1977, during his run of I Love My Wife, he used his fame to vocally state his dissatisfaction with The Shubert Organization –– the organization running the Barrymore Theatre, where the play was being performed –– about pay equity:

Baker was a proponent of actors going to college, believing a "good liberal education is essential" to grounding actors in all the arts.

Later in his career, he expressed wanting to become a playwright and forming a repertory company with Paul Mazursky and Leonard Nimoy.

Little is known of Baker's romantic life. In 1976, he claimed to be "dedicated to remaining a bachelor," but alluded to serious romances with "two or three" women.

Death
In August 1978, Baker's career began to be cut short by thyroid cancer. Baker underwent surgery to remove the cancer. During one of these surgeries Baker's vocal chords were seriously damaged causing irreperable damage to his voice. Despite the cancer and the damage done to his vocal chords, Baker continued to get parts and work as an actor.  "A serious throat ailment," according to articles in the Detroit Free Press and the Hartford Courant published during that month, caused him to leave the cast of the pre-Broadway show Broadway, Broadway. His final television performance was a guest-star appearance on the sitcom Taxi in 1979. His last noted stage performance was in March 1980, in which he reprised the one-act Horovitz plays he had performed in Paris.

He was eventually diagnosed with Medullary thyroid cancer. Decades after Baker's death, commentator David Ehrenstein incorrectly speculated in LA Weekly that Baker had suffered from AIDS, then known as "gay-related immune deficiency" (GRID), for approximately two years before his death. Ehrenstein's 2003 LA Weekly essay includes a quote from actor Anthony Holland that indicates that Baker lived in Los Angeles in 1980.

As Baker's illness worsened, he moved to Miami to live with his parents. There is no reliable source to confirm that his illness was HIV-related, and HIV is not mentioned anywhere in Baker's death certificate. He died on April 12, 1982, at the Community Hospital of South Broward in Hallandale Beach, Florida. He is buried in Moses Mendelsohn Memorial Park in Randolph, Massachusetts.

Stage
Broadway
 The Freedom of the City – Alvin Theatre, 1974
 Secret Service – Playhouse Theatre, 1976 as Henry Dumont
 Boy Meets Girl – Playhouse Theatre, 1976 as Robert Law
 I Love My Wife – Ethel Barrymore Theatre, 1977 as Alvin

Off Broadway
 Conerico Was Here to Stay – Fortune Theatre, 1969 as Young Man
 Summertree – Players Theatre, 1969 as Young Man
 Paradise Gardens East – Fortune Theatre, 1969 as Brother
 The Year Boston Won the Pennant – Mitzi Newhouse Theatre, 1969 as Dillinger/Peabody
 Barbary Shore – Joseph Papp Public Theater/New York Shakespeare Festival, 1973 as Mike Lovett
 Pericles, Prince of Tyre – Joseph Papp Public Theater/New York Shakespeare Festival, 1974 as Thailard/Knight of Ephesus/Boult
 The Merry Wives of Windsor – Joseph Papp Public Theater/New York Shakespeare Festival, 1974 as Abraham Slender
 Henry V – Joseph Papp Public Theater/New York Shakespeare Festival, 1976 as Dauphin
 Measure for Measure – Joseph Papp Public Theater/New York Shakespeare Festival, 1976 as Lucio

Film
 The Hospital (1971) as Dr. Schaefer
 A.W.O.L. (1972) as Sidney Feitel
 The Paper Chase (1973) as William Moss
 Malatesta's Carnival of Blood (1973) as Sonja
 Next Stop, Greenwich Village (1976) as Larry Lapinsky

Television
 The Teaching (1970, TV movie) as Samuel Golden
 Pueblo (1973, TV movie) as Ens. T.L. Harris
 Kojak (1974, episode: "Cross Your Heart and Hope to Die") as Joyce Harrington
 Sunshine (1975, episode: "White Bread and Margarine") as Jinx
 Secret Service (1977, episode: "Secret Service") as Henry Dumont
 The Rubber Gun Squad (1977, TV movie) as Eddie
 Starsky and Hutch (1979, episode: "Ninety Pounds of Trouble") as Damon
 The Rockford Files (1979, episode: "Only Rock 'n' Roll Will Never Die" Parts 1 and 2) as Ronny Martz
 Taxi (1979, episode: "Latka's Revolting") as Baschi (final appearance)

Accolades
Baker was highly praised by critics, including Clive Barnes and Walter Kerr.

He was nominated for Jeff Awards –– for Best Actor in a Principal Role –– for his work in Chicago theatre.

He won the Tony Award for his performance in I Love My Wife.

His performance in Next Stop, Greenwich Village was nominated for a Golden Globe Award in the "Best Acting Debut in a Motion Picture" category.

References

External links

1945 births
1982 deaths
American male film actors
American male musical theatre actors
American male stage actors
American male television actors
Boston University College of Fine Arts alumni
Drama Desk Award winners
Male actors from Massachusetts
Tony Award winners
20th-century American Jews
20th-century American male actors
Brookline High School alumni
20th-century American male singers
20th-century American singers